Philodromus buchari is a spider species found in Europe.

See also 
 List of Philodromidae species

References

External links 

buchari
Spiders of Europe
Spiders described in 2004